The Angang Sewage Disposal Plant is a sewage treatment plant located in the city of Gyeongju, North Gyeongsang province, South Korea. It began operating in April, 2005 by the co-investment of the Government of North Gyeongsang and Gyeongju City with a fund of 44,300,000,000 won to install the facilities to prevent the pollution of Hyeongsan River which is a main water source for Gyeongju and Pohang residents. The plant is located on a spacious site with 39,000 m2 in Homyeong-ri, Gangdong-myeon where nature friendly facilities are also built to provide recreational venues for the locals. Through intercepting sewer pipes with a 56.1 km length and 14 pumping stations, the plant has a capacity in dealing with 18,000 tone of domestic sewage per day that comes from Angang-eup, and Gangdong-myeon in Gyeongju. The facilities have high-powered disposal equipments which are developed by related industrial companies to maintain the final discharging water as the first or second degree water in quality, so that it is used as river maintenance flow and agricultural water in case a drought occurs.

See also
Sewage treatment
Agricultural wastewater treatment
List of waste water treatment technologies
Oceanside Water Pollution Control Plant

References

External links
안강하수처리장 at the Water Quality and Environment Office of the Gyeongju City

Infrastructure completed in 2005
Sewage treatment plants
Buildings and structures in Gyeongju
Water supply and sanitation in South Korea